The Spring Vale Cemetery railway line, in Melbourne, Australia, branched from the now Pakenham Line at Springvale railway station, for a short  journey to the Spring Vale Cemetery. The terminus was a railway station of the same name.

History
The Spring Vale Cemetery branch line and associated station were opened on 1 March 1904 following completion of construction in December 1902. The line was used to transport corpses, funeral cortèges and visitors to the Necropolis. Special hearse vans were constructed to transport the coffins and wreaths.  The line was electrified in December 1922.  Mortuary services ceased in 1943 and the visitor's service was suspended from 10 December 1950, following the end of the statewide 55-day coal strike.  Formal closure was only a book date, being 19 December 1951.

Current status
Throughout the first few months of 1951, the line was dismantled back to the western boundary of the Sandown Park Racecourse, and eventually back to the station side of Sandown Road. By the 1970s, the visible remains of the branch line included a short stub of the line, known as "Siding B", and an electrical sub-station near where the branch junctioned, as well as a short section of the alignment between Sandown Road and the racecourse boundary. A stanchion base could be seen at the end of the Downard Lawn in the Necropolis.

By 2010, the remaining track, overhead power lines and supporting stanchions had been removed, along with other sidings east of Springvale station. The electrical sub-station building remains, along with the rail reservation up to Sandown Park Racecourse, although it is now crossed by Sandown Road.

A commemorative plaque has been placed at the site of the former Cemetery platform.

Station histories

See also
List of closed Melbourne railway stations
List of Melbourne railway stations

References

External links
Signal diagram of the station in 1942

Closed Melbourne railway lines
5 ft 3 in gauge railways in Australia
Railway lines opened in 1904
Railway lines closed in 1951
1904 establishments in Australia
1951 disestablishments in Australia